The 2013 Major League Baseball All-Star Game was the 84th edition of the Major League Baseball All-Star Game. It was held on Tuesday, July 16, 2013 at Citi Field in Queens, New York City, the home of the New York Mets. This was the first time that the Mets have hosted an All-Star Game since 1964, the team's inaugural season at Shea Stadium, and the ninth time the All-Star Game was held in New York City. The game was last held in New York City in 2008, when the old Yankee Stadium hosted it in its final season before being demolished. It was televised in the United States on  Fox.

The American League shut out the National League for the third time in All-Star game history; the National League has six shutouts.  This game marks the first time that there have been shutouts in consecutive All-Star games.

Host selection
The host site was reportedly to either be at Nationals Park in Washington, D.C., home of the Washington Nationals or at Citi Field, the home of the Mets since 2009. The official announcement was made on May 16, 2012, at New York City Hall. The Mets unveiled the logo for the 2013 All-Star Game on August 7, 2012.

Fan balloting

Starters
Balloting for the 2013 All-Star Game starters began online April 24 and ended on July 4. Fan voting also took place in each MLB stadium, beginning May 7 (at the latest) and ended on June 28. The top vote-getters at each position (including the designated hitter for the American League) and the top three among outfielders, were named the starters for their respective leagues. The results were announced on July 6. Chris Davis was the leading vote-getter with 8,272,243 votes, while Yadier Molina led the NL with 6,883,258 ballots.

Final roster spot
After the rosters were revealed, a second ballot of five players per league was created for the All-Star Final Vote to determine the 34th and final player of each roster. The online balloting was conducted from July 6 through July 11.   The winners of the All-Star Final Vote were Steve Delabar of the Toronto Blue Jays (AL) and Freddie Freeman of the Atlanta Braves (NL).

Rosters
Players in italics have since been inducted into the National Baseball Hall of Fame.

American League

National League

Glen Perkins replaced Clay Buchholz on the roster due to injury.
Justin Masterson replaced Jesse Crain on the roster due to injury.
Matt Moore replaced Yu Darvish on the roster due to injury.
Denotes Final Vote Winner.
Chris Tillman replaced Justin Verlander on the roster due to Verlander's ineligibility to pitch.
Mark Melancon replaced Jeff Locke on the roster due to injury.
Sergio Romo replaced Jordan Zimmermann on the roster due to injury.
Brian McCann replaced Freddie Freeman on the roster due to injury.
Greg Holland replaced Hisashi Iwakuma on the roster due to Iwakuma's ineligibility to pitch.
Grant Balfour replaced Bartolo Colón on the roster due to Colon's ineligibility to pitch.
Edward Mujica replaced Adam Wainwright on the roster due to Wainwright's ineligibility to pitch.
Michael Cuddyer was selected to start for the National League as their designated hitter
#: Indicates player would not play (replaced as per reference notes above).

Game summary

Starters

Box score

Umpires: Home Plate, crew chief – John Hirschbeck; First Base – Wally Bell; Second Base – Larry Vanover; Third Base – Paul Emmel; Left Field – Rob Drake; Right Field – Chad Fairchild
Weather: Temperature: , clear; Wind: 9 mph, in from left field 
Time of Game: 3:06 
Attendance: 45,186

Notes
The Yankees Mariano Rivera, who retired at the end of the season, was named the All-Star Game Most Valuable Player. He was the first reliever selected to an All-Star team to ever receive the award, as well as the first pitcher since Pedro Martínez in 1999 and the second Yankee ever after Derek Jeter in 2000.
The attendance of 45,186 was the largest in Citi Field's history.
Yankees TV announcer Michael Kay joined Sciambi and Singleton in the ESPN Radio call from the 2nd to 4th innings.
With the shutout, the "home" league did not score a run in 19 straight innings. 
This game featured Tim McCarver's last All-Star Game with Joe Buck on FOX.

See also

List of Major League Baseball All-Star Game winners
All-Star Futures Game
Home Run Derby (Major League Baseball)

References

External links

Official website of the All-Star Game
2013 Major League Baseball All-Star Game at ESPN

Major League Baseball All-Star Game
Major League Baseball All-Star Game
All-Star Game
Baseball in New York City
Sports in Queens, New York
Major League Baseball All-Star Game
Sports competitions in New York City
2010s in Queens
Flushing, Queens